Calicium viride, commonly known as the green stubble lichen, is a species of pin lichen in the family Caliciaceae, and the type species of the genus Calicium. It is a common and widely distributed species in temperate areas of the Northern Hemisphere and southern South America.

Taxonomy
It was described as a new species by Christiaan Hendrik Persoon in 1794. Calcium viride is the type species of the genus Calicium. The common name for the lichen in North America is "green stubble lichen".

The Calicium viride group is the name of a clade of closely related species that all have ascomata supported on relatively large and sturdy stalks, and spores with a distinctive spiral ornamentation. This group also includes C. corynellum, C. salicinum, and  C. quercinum, as well as Cyphelium lecideinum, which lacks a stalk but also has spiral-striated spores.

Description
Calicium viride has a greenish-yellow thallus with a granular texture that grows as a crust on the surface of its substrate. The small black stalks, 1.5–2.5 mm long and roughly 0.1–0.15 mm thick, support the spore-bearing structures: at the tip of each stalk is a capitulum–a spherical apothecium. The capitula are black with a brownish underside.

Calicium corynellum is a rarer species that is somewhat similar in appearance to C. viride, but it grows on rock instead of wood or bark, and it has shorter stalks, typically 0.5–0.6 mm long.

It contains the secondary chemicals rhizocarpic acid and epanorin.

Habitat and distribution
The lichen is common on the bark and wood of conifer trees in montane forests, but sometimes grows on deciduous trees.

References

viride
Lichen species
Lichens described in 1794
Lichens of Asia
Lichens of Europe
Lichens of North America
Lichens of South America
Taxa named by Christiaan Hendrik Persoon